Bretnor  may refer to:

Reginald Bretnor (1911–1992), science fiction author
Thomas Bretnor, almanac maker
Bretnor Apartments, a historic apartment block in Portland, Oregon